"Best of Both Worlds" is a 1978 single by Robert Palmer from his album Double Fun. The song was included on compilation albums including Addictions: Volume II (1992) and 20th Century Masters (1999).  A live version appeared on 1982's Maybe It's Live and a remix version was included on 1998's Woke Up Laughing.

Chart positions

Weekly

Year-end

References

1978 songs
Robert Palmer (singer) songs
1978 singles
Island Records singles
Songs written by Robert Palmer (singer)